Erica patersonia is a species of Erica heath native to the fynbos region of South Africa.

References

patersonia
Taxa named by Henry Cranke Andrews